Byron Palmer (21 June 1920 – 30 September 2009) was an American film, television and stage actor under contract with 20th Century Fox.

Early years
Palmer was the second of four children of Harlan G. Palmer; a politician, judge, and most notably the owner and publisher of the historic Hollywood Citizen News.  While attending Occidental College, Palmer wrote obituaries for his father's paper and later joined CBS as a page eventually leading him to become a CBS radio news reporter and announcer.  During World War II, Palmer joined the Army Air Forces and ran a radio station on an island in the Pacific. Between news broadcasts, he sang tenor on the air with a quartet called the Music Mates. Soldiers sent him fan mail that persuaded him to take voice lessons after the war.

Film and stage
Palmer made his debut in film in the 1953 film Tonight We Sing. He starred with Jack Palance in Man in the Attic, with Gordon MacRae in The Best Things in Life Are Free and in several other films including Emergency Hospital and Ma and Pa Kettle at Waikiki and the 1956 film Glory.  After acting as master of ceremonies for a touring “Hollywood on Ice” show, he starred with Ray Bolger in Where's Charley? on Broadway in 1948. He was also featured in the early 1950s Broadway revue "Bless You All" with Pearl Bailey.  and the 1956 film Glory.

Television
Palmer hosted the Miss Universe 1958 and Miss Universe 1959 beauty pageants on the CBS and FOX television networks.  Additionally, he hosted the syndicated variety program "This is Your Music" in 1955 and was  co-host of Bride and Groom, which was originally broadcast on CBS and later on NBC in the 1950s.

Palmer made a number of television appearances, including episodes of Perry Mason in the 1950s and 1960s,The Ed Sullivan Show in 1949, The Betty White Show in 1954, Pete and Gladys, How to Marry a Millionaire, Lawman, Soldiers of Fortune, Cavalcade of America, Matinee Theatre and more.

Personal life
Palmer married his high school sweetheart, JoAnn Ramson, in 1944.  He later remarried to beauty queen and actress Ruth Hampton in 1954. In 1982, Palmer remarried once again to actress and professional dancer Georgine Darcy who is best known for her role as Miss Torso in the highly acclaimed Alfred Hitchcock film Rear Window.

Filmography

References

External links

1920 births
2009 deaths
American male stage actors
American male film actors
American male television actors
20th-century American male actors